CTS Main Channel is the flagship free-to-air terrestrial television channel of the Chinese Television System network and is the third oldest free-to-air terrestrial television channel in the Republic of China (Taiwan) after TTV Main Channel and CTV Main Channel.

History
The origins of CTS Main Channel go all the way back to 1956 when the Education Minister of the Republic of China Chang Chi-yun proposed an educational television service that world be run by Taiwan's Ministry of Education. Efforts to prepare the said television service began in 1958 when studio space was first allocated in the Ministry of Education's headquarters, and in August 1961, Education Minister Huang Chi-lu formally established Taiwan's National Education Television (NETV), which first went on air on February 14, 1962, nearly 8 months before TTV Main Channel began transmissions. NETV closed down on February 16, 1970, after it was purchased by the Taiwanese government for NT$1 billion, and in May 1970, Order 117 of the Executive Yuan proposed the formation of a third television channel to succeed NETV. CTS Main Channel was eventually launched on January 31, 1971, as a joint venture between Taiwan's Ministry of National Defense and the Ministry of Education.

On July 1, 2006, by virtue of the Taiwanese government's media reform law, CTS Main Channel was incorporated into the Taiwan Broadcasting System (TBS), the island state's consortium of public television stations, with Public Television Service (PTS) as the other member of the group. The absorption calls for the transfer of the station's main studios from Taipei to Kaohsiung in a span of five years. It shall, however, be allowed to continue generating its income through traditional advertisements, and maintain its 60-40 entertainment-news programming mix like before.

CTS Main Channel is currently engaged in a campaign to restore its title as "Taiwan's drama authority", for having been home to some of Taiwan's most unforgettable drama serials.

Appearances

Test card
The test card of CTS is Philips PM5544.

Opening and Closing times
CTS Main Channel is on air 24 hours each day.
Except the last day and first day open at 5.00 am and closing 4.00 am.

Note:
 The song "中華民國國歌" Zhōng Huá Mín Gúo Gúo Gē (National Anthem of the Republic of China), lyrics by Sun Yat-sen (孫中山) and composed by Ch'eng Mao-yün (程懋筠) was played at the start of each broadcast day.

See also
 Media of Taiwan

Television stations in Taiwan
Television channels and stations established in 1971
Taiwan Broadcasting System
Television channels and stations established in 1962
Television channels and stations disestablished in 1970